Chef-Boutonne is a commune in the Deux-Sèvres department in the Nouvelle-Aquitaine region in western France. On 1 January 2019, the former communes La Bataille, Crézières and Tillou were merged into Chef-Boutonne.

Geography
The Boutonne has its source in the commune, hence its name, Chef-Boutonne meaning head of the Boutonne.

See also
Communes of the Deux-Sèvres department

References

Communes of Deux-Sèvres